Vidisha Museum or Vidisha District Museum is the main museum of the city of Vidisha, ancient Besnagar.

The museum has many sculptures, terracottas and coins, especially from the 9th to the 10 th century CE, as well as Harappan art. 

A famous statue of a Yaksha, usually dated to the time of the Mauryan Empire or the Sunga Empire, can be seen.

Address: H.N. 204, Block Colony, NH86, Block Colony, Durga Nagar, Vidisha, Madhya Pradesh 464001, India

References

Museums in Madhya Pradesh
Vidisha
Tourist attractions in Vidisha district